The 1957 Governor General's Awards for Literary Merit were the twenty-first such awards in Canada.  The awards in this period an honour for the authors but had no monetary prize.

Winners
Fiction: Gabrielle Roy, Street of Riches.
Poetry or Drama: Jay Macpherson, The Boatman.
Non-Fiction: Bruce Hutchison, Canada: Tomorrow's Giant.
Non-Fiction: Thomas H. Raddall, The Path of Destiny.
Juvenile: Kerry Wood, The Great Chief.

Governor General's Awards
Governor General's Awards
Governor General's Awards